The Halona Pueblo, also known as Zuni Pueblo, is located 36 miles south of Gallup, New Mexico on NM 32 & NM 53.

The pueblo dates from before 1539, which was when Europeans first visited New Mexico.  It was one of the original six pueblos of the Zuni people.  The Fray Marcos de Niza expedition, led by Estevan the Moor, arrived to the area in 1539; most of its party were killed by the Zunis.  Coronado's expedition a year later was disappointed not to find great wealth.

It was listed on the National Register of Historic Places in 1975.

The Wikipedia article Zuni Pueblo or Zuni Pueblo, New Mexico is about a CDP.  It should be more explaining this as "the reservation headquarters community of Zuni Pueblo".

Zuni Indian Reservation

Hawikuh Ruins is a National Historic Landmark 12 miles away.

Zuni-Cibola Complex, a National Historic Landmark District, was proposed as a National Park.

Area: 1500 acres.

References

National Register of Historic Places in McKinley County, New Mexico
Buildings and structures completed in 1539